In enzymology, an acylglycerol kinase is an enzyme that catalyzes the chemical reaction

ATP + acylglycerol  ADP + acyl-sn-glycerol 3-phosphate

The two substrates of this enzyme are ATP and acylglycerol, whereas its two products are ADP and acyl-sn-glycerol 3-phosphate.

This enzyme belongs to the family of transferases, specifically those transferring phosphorus-containing groups (phosphotransferases) with an alcohol group as acceptor. The systematic name of this enzyme class is ATP:acylglycerol 3-phosphotransferase. Other names in common use include monoacylglycerol kinase, monoacylglycerol kinase (phosphorylating), sn-2-monoacylglycerol kinase, MGK, monoglyceride kinase, and monoglyceride phosphokinase.  This enzyme participates in glycerolipid metabolism.

References 

 
 

EC 2.7.1
Enzymes of unknown structure